Regina Zygmanto Kalinichenko (née Shymkute, born 21 December 1985 in Kherson) is a former Ukrainian (until 2014) and Russian (since 2014) handballer playing for Rostov-Don. She announced her retirement in May 2020.

Personal life 
Regina was born on December 21, 1985 in Kherson, Ukraine to a Lithuanian father and an ethnic Russian mother. In March 2012 she changed her citizenship to Russian.

On April 19, 2017 she gave birth to her daughter Taisia.

After marriage she changed her surname to Kalinichenko.

Individual awards
EHF Cup Winners' Cup Top Scorer: 2013

References

External links 

 Regina Kalinichenko at Rostov-Don website

Sportspeople from Kherson
1985 births
Living people
Russian female handball players
Ukrainian female handball players
Expatriate handball players
Ukrainian expatriate sportspeople in Hungary
Ukrainian expatriate sportspeople in Romania
Ukrainian expatriate sportspeople in Russia
Ukrainian emigrants to Russia
SCM Râmnicu Vâlcea (handball) players
Naturalised citizens of Russia
Ukrainian people of Lithuanian descent
Ukrainian people of Russian descent